Querschnitt ("Cross section") is a compilation album by German industrial metal band Megaherz. It was released in 2001.

Track listing

CD 1
 "Miststück" - 3:29
 "Gott sein" - 4:13
 "Kopf durch die Wand" - 4:29
 "Wer bist du?" - 3:05
 "Kopfschuss" - 4:19
 "Herz aus Stein" - 4:04
 "Jordan" - 3:38
 "Burn" - 1:37
 "Rappunzel" - 3:57
 "Himmelfahrt" - 6:01
 "Tanz auf dem Vulkan" - 5:41
 "Das Licht am Ende der Welt" - 4:23
 "Hurra – Wir leben noch" - 4:43
 "Schlag' zurück" - 3:59
 "Teufel" - 5:00
 "Hänschenklein '97" - 2:50

CD 2
 "Freiflug" (radio edit) - 3:48
 "Freiflug" - 4.58
 "Liebestöter (Club Mix)" - 4.35
 "Liebestöter (Atomic Mix)" - 5:33
 "Rock Me, Amadeus" (radio edit) - 3:26
 "Rock Me, Amadeus (Fieberwahn Mix)" - 6:02
 "Gott sein (Blemish's Buss & Bet Mix)" - 7:39
 "Gott sein (Kerosin Take Off Mix)" - 4:30
 "Himmelfahrt" (radio edit) - 4:29

Multimedia bonus track
 "Freiflug" (music video) - 3:46

References

2001 compilation albums
Megaherz albums